Waiau Pa is a small town of Auckland, New Zealand. It is in the Franklin Ward of Auckland Council. The name means "River of swirling currents" in the Māori language.

The Waiau Pa Presbyterian Church on the corner of McKenzie Road and Seagrove Road was built in 1914.

The Taihiki River runs south and southwest of Waiau Pa, and the Manukau Harbour is to the north.

Demographics
Waiau Pā is part of the larger Karaka Creek statistical area

Waiau Pā had a population of 453 at the 2018 New Zealand census, an increase of 129 people (39.8%) since the 2013 census, and an increase of 195 people (75.6%) since the 2006 census. There were 147 households, comprising 228 males and 225 females, giving a sex ratio of 1.01 males per female, with 84 people (18.5%) aged under 15 years, 66 (14.6%) aged 15 to 29, 255 (56.3%) aged 30 to 64, and 45 (9.9%) aged 65 or older.

Ethnicities were 86.8% European/Pākehā, 9.9% Māori, 5.3% Pacific peoples, 7.3% Asian, and 2.6% other ethnicities. People may identify with more than one ethnicity.

Although some people chose not to answer the census's question about religious affiliation, 58.3% had no religion, 33.1% were Christian, 1.3% had Māori religious beliefs, 2.0% were Hindu and 2.6% had other religions.

Of those at least 15 years old, 63 (17.1%) people had a bachelor's or higher degree, and 51 (13.8%) people had no formal qualifications. 129 people (35.0%) earned over $70,000 compared to 17.2% nationally. The employment status of those at least 15 was that 237 (64.2%) people were employed full-time, 60 (16.3%) were part-time, and 6 (1.6%) were unemployed.

Karaka Creek

Karaka Creek had a population of 1,539 at the 2018 New Zealand census, an increase of 213 people (16.1%) since the 2013 census, and an increase of 273 people (21.6%) since the 2006 census. There were 519 households, comprising 792 males and 747 females, giving a sex ratio of 1.06 males per female. The median age was 44.6 years (compared with 37.4 years nationally), with 303 people (19.7%) aged under 15 years, 219 (14.2%) aged 15 to 29, 804 (52.2%) aged 30 to 64, and 213 (13.8%) aged 65 or older.

Ethnicities were 90.3% European/Pākehā, 9.2% Māori, 2.9% Pacific peoples, 6.0% Asian, and 1.9% other ethnicities. People may identify with more than one ethnicity.

The percentage of people born overseas was 17.5, compared with 27.1% nationally.

Although some people chose not to answer the census's question about religious affiliation, 57.7% had no religion, 31.2% were Christian, 0.4% had Māori religious beliefs, 1.0% were Hindu, 0.4% were Muslim, 0.6% were Buddhist and 2.1% had other religions.

Of those at least 15 years old, 231 (18.7%) people had a bachelor's or higher degree, and 180 (14.6%) people had no formal qualifications. The median income was $45,500, compared with $31,800 nationally. 378 people (30.6%) earned over $70,000 compared to 17.2% nationally. The employment status of those at least 15 was that 717 (58.0%) people were employed full-time, 231 (18.7%) were part-time, and 18 (1.5%) were unemployed.

Education

References

Populated places in the Auckland Region
Populated places around the Manukau Harbour